Casa Capotesta is a house in Pinamar Partido, a coastal resort in the province of Buenos Aires, Argentina. It was designed in 1983 by the architect Clorindo Testa, who was a prominent member of the Argentine rationalist movement and one of the pioneers of brutalist architecture there.  He designed the house for himself, as a summer residence.  The name of the house is a play on capo, Italian for "head" or "leader", and the surname of the (Italian born) architect.

The house is situated about 200 metres from the beach.  
The house is a large central cube with three rectangular shapes protruding out at odd angles creating striking angular geometries.  Testa's architecture of that period is said to have acquired a more reflective, poetically human dimension.

References

External links
 Casa de veraneo - Capotesta/ 1983 / 1985 The summer house - Capotesta (in Spanish). The page displays a few basic architectural sketches
 Casas que hicieron historia (in Spanish) "Houses that made history" Biblioteca de la Facultad de Arquitectura, Diseño y Urbanismo, Argentina

Architecture in Argentina
Brutalist architecture in Argentina
Houses in Argentina
Houses completed in 1985